The 2021 season is Rosenborg's 42nd consecutive year in the top flight now known as Eliteserien, their 53rd season in the top flight of Norwegian football. They will participate in Eliteserien, Cup and Europa Conference League entering at the Second Qualifying round. This will be Åge Hareide's first full season as Rosenborg manager. The start of the season was postponed from 5 April to 8 May due to the COVID-19 pandemic.

Squad

Transfers

Winter

In:

Out:

Summer

In:

Out:

Friendlies

Competitions

Eliteserien

Results summary

Results by round

Results

Table

Norwegian Cup

UEFA Europa Conference League

Second qualifying round

Third qualifying round

Play-off round

Squad statistics

Appearances and goals

|-
|colspan="14"|Players away from Rosenborg on loan:
|-

|-
|colspan="14"|Players who appeared for Rosenborg no longer at the club:
|-

|}

Disciplinary record

See also
Rosenborg BK seasons

References 

2021
Rosenborg
Rosenborg